Everest College was a for-profit career college in Springfield, Missouri, formerly known as Springfield College. Everest College offered diplomas, associate and bachelor's degrees in the fields of business, administration, computer technology, legal, and health care programs.

Everest College was in no way affiliated with Springfield College, located in Springfield, MA, or any of the Springfield College regional campuses.

History
On October 17, 1996, Corinthian Colleges, Inc. acquired Springfield Business College in Springfield, Missouri, and the name of the college was changed to Springfield College. The Ontario Metro campus is a branch of Springfield Business College in Springfield, Missouri.

In October 2000, the name was changed to Rhodes College. In April 2002, the name of the college was changed back to Springfield College in order to return to its roots as a community-based institution.

In March 2006, the name of the college was changed to Everest College at which time the Ontario Metro campus moved to a new building at 1819 South Excise Avenue in Ontario, California.

Former campuses
Everest College Springfield
1010 West Sunshine St.
Springfield, MO 65807

Everest College Ontario Metro
1819 S. Excise Avenue
Ontario, CA 91761

Everest College Ontario Metro campus is located in San Bernardino County and is part of the Southern California region known as the Inland Empire.

The school is owned by Corinthian Colleges, Inc.

Programs offered
 Accounting (Associate or Bachelor of Science degrees)
 Bachelor of Applied Management
 Business Accounting
 Business Administration (Diploma or Bachelor of Science degree)
 Computer Information Science (Diploma or Bachelor of Science degree)
 Dental Assistant
 Medical Administrative Assistant
 Medical Assistant
 Paralegal (Associate or Bachelor of Science degrees)

References

For-profit universities and colleges in the United States
Corinthian Colleges